The Moldova national handball team is the national handball team of Moldova, representing the country in international matches. It is controlled by the Handball Federation of Moldova.

IHF Emerging Nations Championship record
2015 – 6th place
2017 – 9th place
2023 – Qualified

External links
Official website
IHF profile

Men's national handball teams
National sports teams of Moldova